She Couldn't Help It is a lost 1920 American silent comedy-drama and romance film directed by Maurice Campbell and starring Bebe Daniels. The story is based on the novel In the Bishop’s Carriage by Miriam Michelson and play of the same name by Channing Pollock.

The novel and play were previously filmed in 1913 as In the Bishop's Carriage starring Mary Pickford.

Cast
Bebe Daniels as Young Nance Olden
Emory Johnson as William Lattimer
Wade Boteler as Tom Dorgan
Vera Lewis as Mother Hogan
Herbert Standing as Bishop Van Wagenen
Z. Wall Covington as Mr. Ramsey
Helen Raymond as Mrs. Ramsey
Ruth Renick as Nellie Ramsey
Gertrude Short as Mag Monahan
Milla Davenport as Matron

References

External links

Newspaper advertisement of the film with image of Daniels

American silent feature films
Lost American films
Films based on American novels
American films based on plays
Films based on multiple works
1920 romantic comedy films
American romantic comedy films
American black-and-white films
Films directed by Maurice Campbell
1920 lost films
Lost comedy films
1920s American films
Silent romantic comedy films
Silent American comedy films
1920s English-language films
Silent American comedy-drama films
Silent crime comedy films